Balveh is a village in Shuy Rural District, in the Central District of Baneh County, Kurdistan Province, Iran. At the 2006 census, its population was 28, in 7 families. The village is populated by Kurds.

References 

Towns and villages in Baneh County
Kurdish settlements in Kurdistan Province